Pauline Hassoun,  (1895 - 1969) was an Iraqi journalist and teacher, who was the first woman to found and publish a magazine in Iraq.

Biography 

Hassoun was born in Ottman Empire (in an area that is now Jordan) in 1895 to a father from Mesopotamia and a Syrian mother. Her family moved between the areas of the Ottoman Empire that are now Syria, Palestine and Jordan, and also spent some time in Egypt before she settled in Baghdad. There, she was a founding member of the Women's Awakening Club. Her cousin was Salim Hassoun, who was the owner of the newspaper Al-Alam Al-Arabi.

Interested in journalism, Hassoun founded Layla in 1923 as a magazine that would publish "everything new and useful related to science, art, literature, society and housekeeping". The first issue was published on 15 October 1923. The magazine ran for two years, with a final issue published on 15 August 1925. Hassoun closed it due financial reasons and since anti-feminist campaigns against her forced her to leave Baghdad. She left in December 1925. The magazine is considered "Iraq's first feminist journal". She also worked as the head teacher of a girl's school in Baghdad. Little is known of her later life and she died in 1969.

Legacy 
Hassoun is considered Iraq's first woman journalist and a feminist pioneer in the country.

References 

1895 births
1969 deaths
Iraqi journalists
Iraqi women journalists
Women editors
Jordanian journalists
Jordanian women journalists
People from Baghdad
Women magazine editors
Expatriates from the Ottoman Empire in Egypt